The 2016 Players Championship was a golf tournament in Florida on the PGA Tour, held  at TPC Sawgrass in Ponte Vedra Beach, southeast of Jacksonville. It was the 43rd Players Championship.

Jason Day, number one in the world rankings and reigning PGA Champion, led wire-to-wire to win his first Players, four strokes ahead of runner-up Kevin Chappell. With favorable scoring conditions early, Day was at 129 (−15) after 36 holes and then shot even par on the weekend.

Defending champion Rickie Fowler missed the 36-hole cut by a stroke.

Venue

Course layout

Field
The field consisted of 144 players meeting the following criteria:

1. Winners of PGA Tour events since last Players
Steven Bowditch (2), Jason Day (2,4,7,8,9,13), Jason Dufner (2,4), Tony Finau (2), Rickie Fowler (2,5,9), Fabián Gómez (2), Branden Grace (9), Emiliano Grillo (9), James Hahn (2), J. J. Henry (2), Jim Herman (2), Charley Hoffman (2,9), Zach Johnson (2,4,9), Smylie Kaufman (9), Chris Kirk (2), Kevin Kisner (2,9,13), Russell Knox (2,7,9,13), Danny Lee (2,9), David Lingmerth (2,8,9), Davis Love III (2), Shane Lowry (7,9), Peter Malnati, Hideki Matsuyama (2,9), Graeme McDowell, Rory McIlroy (2,4,7,9), Troy Merritt (2), Scott Piercy (2), Adam Scott (2,4,7,9,13), Brandt Snedeker (2,9,13), Jordan Spieth (2,4,6,9,13), Brian Stuard, Vaughn Taylor, Justin Thomas (2,9,13), Bubba Watson (2,4,7,9,13), Danny Willett (4,9)
Charl Schwartzel (2,9) did not play.

2. Top 125 from previous season's FedEx Cup points list
Daniel Berger (9), Zac Blair, Jonas Blixt, Jason Bohn, Keegan Bradley (4), Scott Brown, Chad Campbell, Paul Casey (9), Alex Čejka, Kevin Chappell, Chad Collins, Erik Compton, Jon Curran, Brendon de Jonge, Graham DeLaet, Luke Donald, Ken Duke, Harris English, Matt Every (8), Jim Furyk (9), Sergio García (9), Andres Gonzales, Retief Goosen, Jason Gore, Bill Haas (9), Chesson Hadley, Adam Hadwin, Brian Harman, Pádraig Harrington, David Hearn, Russell Henley, Morgan Hoffmann, J. B. Holmes (9), Billy Horschel (6,9), Charles Howell III, John Huh, Dustin Johnson (7,9), Matt Jones, Jerry Kelly, Colt Knost, Brooks Koepka (9), Jason Kokrak, Matt Kuchar (5,9), Martin Laird, Marc Leishman (9), Spencer Levin, Hunter Mahan, Ben Martin, William McGirt, George McNeill, Phil Mickelson (4,9), Bryce Molder, Francesco Molinari, Ryan Moore (9), Kevin Na (9,13), Sean O'Hair, Louis Oosthuizen (9), Carlos Ortiz, Jeff Overton, Greg Owen, Ryan Palmer, Carl Pettersson, Scott Pinckney, Ian Poulter, Patrick Reed (7,9,13), Kyle Reifers, Justin Rose (4,9), John Senden, Vijay Singh, Brendan Steele, Shawn Stefani, Henrik Stenson (6,9), Robert Streb, Kevin Streelman, Chris Stroud, Daniel Summerhays, Hudson Swafford, Nick Taylor, Brendon Todd, Cameron Tringale, Camilo Villegas, Johnson Wagner, Jimmy Walker (9), Boo Weekley, Steve Wheatcroft, Will Wilcox, Mark Wilson, Gary Woodland
Bae Sang-moon, Stewart Cink, Tim Clark, Ryo Ishikawa, Pat Perez, John Peterson, Rory Sabbatini, Webb Simpson (4), Nick Watney, and Lee Westwood (9) did not play.

3. Top 125 (medical)
Freddie Jacobson

4. Major champions from the past five years
Ernie Els, Martin Kaymer (5)
Darren Clarke did not play.

5. Players Championship winners from the past five years
K. J. Choi
Tiger Woods (7) did not play.

6. The Tour Championship winners from the past three years

7. World Golf Championship winners from the past three years

8. Memorial Tournament and Arnold Palmer Invitational winners since 2015 

9. Top 50 from the Official World Golf Ranking
An Byeong-hun, Kiradech Aphibarnrat, Rafa Cabrera-Bello, Matt Fitzpatrick, Søren Kjeldsen, Andy Sullivan, Bernd Wiesberger
Thongchai Jaidee and Kim Kyung-tae did not play.

10. Senior Players champion from prior year
Bernhard Langer

11. Web.com Tour money leader from prior season
Patton Kizzire

12. Money leader during the Web.com Tour Finals
Chez Reavie

13. Top 10 current year FedEx Cup points leaders

14. Remaining positions and alternates filled through current year FedEx Cup standings
Ricky Barnes, Kim Si-woo, Jamie Lovemark, Patrick Rodgers, Harold Varner III, Jhonattan Vegas

These players were all in the first 73 places in the standings, as of May 2.
Aaron Baddeley – replaced Webb Simpson

Nationalities in the field

Round summaries

First round
Thursday, May 12, 2016

Second round
Friday, May 13, 2016
Saturday, May 14, 2016

A two-hour weather delay on Friday afternoon caused several players to suspend their rounds due to darkness. Among these was Day, who completed the final four holes of his second round on Saturday morning; play resumed at 9:15 a.m. EDT.

Third round
Saturday, May 14, 2016

With the second round completed on Saturday morning, the third round was played in groupings of three from split tees. Scores were significantly higher than the first two rounds, as the course conditions toughened. Ken Duke shot 65 (−7) for the best round of the day and Hideki Matsuyama carded a 67; both joined Alex Čejka in a tie for second, four strokes behind Day, who recorded a one-over 73.

Final round
Sunday, May 15, 2016

Scorecard
Final round

Cumulative tournament scores, relative to par
{|class="wikitable" span = 50 style="font-size:85%;
|-
|  style="background:Red; width:10px;"|
|Eagle
|  style="background:Pink; width:10px;"|
|Birdie
|  style="background:PaleGreen; width:10px;"|
|Bogey
|  style="background:Green; width:10px;"|
|Double bogey
|}
Source:

References

External links

2016
2016 in golf
2016 in American sports
2016 in sports in Florida
May 2016 sports events in the United States